Better Times Are Coming is the third studio album released in 1970 by supergroup Rhinoceros on the Elektra Records label.

Track listing

Singles
The first single was "Let's Party" written by Guy Draper. The B-side, "Old Age", was written by drummer Duke Edwards with Larry Leishman.

Personnel
Rhinoceros
John Finley - vocals
Danny Weis, Larry Leishman - guitar
Peter Hodgson - bass
Michael Fonfara - organ
Duke Edwards - drums, vocals
with:
The Rhinets - vocals on "Let's Party"
Technical
Dennis R. Murphy, Guy Draper - mixing
Roy Cicala, Shelly Yakus - engineers and special effects
Joel Brodsky - photography

Reception
In a review of the album from 1970, Billboard Magazine says the "instrumentals are tight and gutsy, and the message is strictly positive with the sway of soul." Other reviews were less complimentary.

References

1970 albums
Elektra Records albums
Albums with cover art by Joel Brodsky